Leonel Hernán González (born 15 March 1994) is an Argentine professional footballer who plays as a left-back for Argentinos Juniors, on loan from Godoy Cruz.

Career
González progressed through the Newell's Old Boys ranks. He never made a competitive appearance for them, but was an unused substitute for Primera División fixtures with Vélez Sarsfield and Arsenal de Sarandí in 2013. January 2016 saw González join Primera B Metropolitana team Estudiantes. He made his senior debut on 10 April in a 3–0 loss away to Deportivo Español. Five more appearances arrived in the 2016 campaign, which preceded a further sixty-seven across the next three seasons - which culminated with promotion in 2018–19, as González also scored for the first time versus Sacachispas on 18 May 2019.

After one goal in sixteen encounters in the 2019–20 Primera B Nacional for Estudiantes, González departed on loan in August 2020 to Primera División side Godoy Cruz until the end of 2022, with a purchase option. Diego Martínez selected him for his top-flight debut on 2 November, as he featured for the full duration of a loss away against Rosario Central. At the end of November 2021, Godoy Cruz triggered the purchase option and signed González on a deal until the end of 2024.

On 11 July 2022, Argentinos Juniors officially presented Leonel González as their new reinforcement, with the player signing a loan deal until the end of 2023 with a purchase option.

Career statistics
.

Notes

References

External links

1994 births
Living people
People from Concordia, Entre Ríos
Argentine footballers
Association football defenders
Primera B Metropolitana players
Primera Nacional players
Newell's Old Boys footballers
Estudiantes de Buenos Aires footballers
Godoy Cruz Antonio Tomba footballers
Argentinos Juniors footballers
Sportspeople from Entre Ríos Province